was the 91st emperor of Japan, according to the traditional order of succession.  His reign spanned the years from 1274 through 1287.

This 13th-century sovereign was named after the 9th-century Emperor Uda and go- (後), translates literally as "later"; and thus, he is sometimes called the "Later Emperor Uda," or in some older sources, may be identified as "Emperor Uda, the second" or as "Emperor Uda II."

Genealogy
Before his ascension to the Chrysanthemum Throne, his personal name (imina) was Yohito (世仁).

He was the second son of Emperor Kameyama. They were from the Daikaku-ji line.

Consort: Imperial Princess Reishi (姈子内親王; 1270–1307) later Yūgimon'in (遊義門院), Emperor Go-Fukakusa's daughter

Consort: Horikawa (Minamoto) Motoko (堀河（源）基子) later Nishika'mon-in (西華門院; 1269–1355), Horikawa Tomomori's daughter
First son: Imperial Prince Kuniharu (邦治親王) later Emperor Go-Nijō

Lady-in-waiting: Itsutsuji (Fujiwara) Chushi (五辻（藤原）忠子; 1268–1319) later Dantenmon'in (談天門院), Itsutsuji Tadatsugu's daughter
First daughter: Imperial Princess Shōshi (1286–1348) (奨子内親王) later Tatchimon-in (達智門院)
Second son: Imperial Prince Takaharu (尊治親王) later Emperor Go-Daigo
Third son: Imperial Prince Priest Shōen (性円法親王; 1292–1347)
Fourth son: Imperial Prince Priest Shokaku (承覚法親王; b. 1294)

Consort: Princess Mizuko (瑞子女王) later Eikamon'in (永嘉門院; 1272–1329), Prince Munetaka's daughter

Consort: Ichijo-no-Tsubone（一条局）, Hashimoto Sanetoshi's daughter
Fifth Son: Imperial Prince Priest Shosi (性勝法親王; d. 1354)

Consort: Princess Rinshi (掄子女王), Prince Munetaka's daughter
Second daughter: Imperial Princess Baishi (禖子内親王) later Sūmeimon-in (崇明門院), married Imperial Prince Kuniyoshi

Consort: Itsutsuji Munechika's daughter
Third daughter: Imperial Princess Tōshi/Chūshi (愉子内親王)

Consort: Kazan'in Nagamasa’s daughter
Princess

Consort: Shinsanmi-no-tsubone (新三位局)
 Prince (b. 1307)

Events of Go-Uda's life
Yohito-shinnō became crown prince in 1268.  According to the terms of the late emperor's will (Go-Saga died in 1272), in 1274, he would become emperor upon the death or abdication of Emperor Kameyama.

 6 March 1274 (Bun'ei 11, 26th day of the 1st month): In the 15th year of Kameyama-tennōs reign (亀山天皇十五年), the emperor abdicated; and the succession (senso) was received by his cousin.
 4 May 1274 (Bun'ei 11, 26th day of the 3rd month):  Emperor Go-Uda is said to have acceded to the throne (sokui).

The retired Emperor Kameyama continued to exercise power as cloistered emperor.

During his reign, the unsuccessful Mongol invasions of Japan occurred, first in 1274 and again in 1281. Though they established a beachhead at Hakata, Kyushu, they were driven out within a short time.

 23 November 1275 (Kenji 1, 5th day of the 11th month): Hirohito-shinnō was named Crown Prince and heir to his first cousin, the Daikakuji-tō Emperor Go-Uda.  This was the result of political maneuvering by Hirohito's father, the Jimyōin-tō Emperor Go-Fukakusa.

In 1287, retired Emperor Go-Fukakusa, dissatisfied with the fact that his own lineage (the Jimyōin-tō) did not control the throne, while that of his younger brother, the retired Emperor Kameyama (the Daikakuji-tō) did, persuaded both the Bakufu and the imperial court to compel the Emperor to abdicate in favor of Go-Fukakusa's son (Emperor Fushimi).

After this time, the struggle between the Jimyōin-tō and the Daikakuji-tō over the imperial throne continued.  After Go-Uda's abdication, his Daikakuji-tō controlled the throne from 1301 to 1308 (Emperor Go-Nijō) and again from 1318 until the era of northern and southern courts (begun 1332) when they became the southern court (ending in 1392).

Go-Uda was cloistered emperor during the reign of his own son, Go-Nijō, from 1301 until 1308, and again from 1318, when his second son Go-Daigo took the throne until 1321, when Go-Daigo began direct rule.

 16 July 1324 (Genkō 4, 25th day of the 6th month): Go-Uda died at age 58.

Emperor Go-Uda's Imperial mausoleum is the Rengebuji no misasagi (蓮華峯寺陵) in Ukyō-ku, Kyoto.

Kugyō
Kugyō (公卿) is a collective term for the very few most powerful men attached to the court of the Emperor of Japan in pre-Meiji eras. Even during those years in which the court's actual influence outside the palace walls was minimal, the hierarchic organization persisted.

In general, this elite group included only three to four men at a time.  These were hereditary courtiers whose experience and background would have brought them to the pinnacle of a life's career.  During Go-Uda's reign, this apex of the Daijō-kan included:
 Sesshō, Kujō Tadaie, 1274
 Sesshō, Ichijō Ietsune, 1274–1275
 Sesshō, Takatsukasa Kanehira,	1275–1278
 Kampaku, Takatsukasa Kanehira, 1278–1287
 Kampaku, Nijō Morotada, 1287–1289
 Sadaijin
 Udaijin
 Nadaijin
 Dainagon

Eras of Go-Uda's reign
The years of Go-Uda's reign are more specifically identified by more than one era name or nengō.
 Bun'ei                (1264–1275)
 Kenji  (1275–1278)
 Kōan             (1278–1288)

Notes

See also
 Emperor of Japan
 List of Emperors of Japan
 Imperial cult

References
 Ponsonby-Fane, Richard Arthur Brabazon. (1959).  The Imperial House of Japan. Kyoto: Ponsonby Memorial Society. OCLC 194887
 Titsingh, Isaac. (1834). Nihon Ōdai Ichiran; ou,  Annales des empereurs du Japon.  Paris: Royal Asiatic Society, Oriental Translation Fund of Great Britain and Ireland. OCLC 5850691
 Varley, H. Paul. (1980). Jinnō Shōtōki: A Chronicle of Gods and Sovereigns. New York: Columbia University Press. ; OCLC 5914584

External links 
 Kyoto National Museum  – "Treasures of Daikaku-ji", including portrait of Go-Uda and the former-emperor's will

 
 

Japanese emperors
1267 births
1324 deaths
Emperor Go-Uda
Emperor Go-Uda
Emperor Go-Uda
13th-century Japanese monarchs
14th-century Japanese people
Japanese retired emperors
People from Kyoto